Biyani International Institute of Engineering & Technology (Closed) was a private girls engineering college (Now Closed) run by Biyani Shikshan Samiti in the State of Rajasthan, India. The campus was in Kalwar, Jaipur. Biyani Shikshan Samiti is registered under the Rajasthan Society Registration Act, 1958 having Reg. No. 500/Jaipur/1997-98.

History
Biyani International Institute of Engineering & Technology was run by the Biyani Shikshan Samiti which was formed in 1997 with the objective of Women Empowerment through technical education.

Recognition
The Institution was affiliated with Rajasthan Technical University, Kota. The Institution was approved by All India Council for Technical Education.

References

External links 
 Biyani Group of College

Engineering colleges in Jaipur
Women's engineering colleges in India
Women's universities and colleges in Rajasthan